Pred may refer to:

 Prednisolone, as a tradename, and abbreviation
 Predator, as an abbreviation
 Macro (computer science), as an abbreviation of "predefined"/"predefinition" 
 Allan Pred (1936-2007) U.S. geographer
 Michele Pred, Swedish-American feminist artist

See also
 Predator (disambiguation), abbreviation of several entries
 Predicate (disambiguation), abbreviation of several entries